The Belgian State Railways Type 4 was a class of  steam locomotives for passenger traffic, introduced in 1878.

Construction history
The locomotives were built by various manufacturers from 1878–1881.
The machines had an outside frame and inside cylinders and a Stephenson valve gear.

References

Bibliography

2-6-2T locomotives
Steam locomotives of Belgium
Standard gauge locomotives of Belgium
1′C1′ n2t locomotives
Railway locomotives introduced in 1878